William Thierry Preyer (4 July 1841 – 15 July 1897) was an English-born physiologist who worked in Germany.

Biography
Preyer was born in Rusholme at Manchester. He studied physiology and chemistry at Heidelberg, where he received his doctorate in 1862. In 1866 he earned his medical degree at the University of Bonn, and in 1869 succeeded Johann Nepomuk Czermak (1828-1873) as professor of physiology at the University of Jena. At Jena he was also director of the Physiology Institute. His students included Argentinian Roberto Wernicke.

Preyer was a founder of scientific child psychology, and a pioneer in regards to research of human development based on empirical observation and experimentation. He was inspired by Charles Darwin's theory of evolution and Gustav Fechner’s work in psychophysics.

He authored Die Seele des Kindes (The soul of the child) in 1882. This was a landmark book on developmental psychology written as a rigorous case study of his own daughter’s development, including observational records. It was translated to English in 1888. He was also the author of another landmark book on developmental physiology titled Specielle Physiologie des Embryo (Special physiology of the embryo). Both works laid a foundation in their respective disciplines for future study of modern human development.

At Jena, Preyer introduced experimental-scientific training methods into his lectures, and also created seminars in the field of physiology. Today, the "William Thierry Preyer Award" is issued by the European Society on Developmental Psychology for excellence in research of human development.

Works

 De haemoglobino observationes et experimenta. dissertation, (University of Bonn) 1866.
 Die Blutkrystalle. Jena 1871 - The "blood crystal".
 Naturwissenschaftliche Thatsachen und Probleme. Paetel, Berlin, 1880 - Scientific facts and problems.
 Die Entdeckung des Hypnotismus. Dargestellt von W. Preyer … Nebst einer ungedruckten Original-Abhandlung von Braid in Deutscher Uebersetzung. Berlin: Paetel, 1881 - The discovery of hypnotism. represented by W. Preyer ... Also an unpublished original essay by James Braid in German translation.
 Die Seele des Kindes: Beobachtungen über die geistige Entwicklung des Menschen in den ersten Lebensjahren. Grieben, Leipzig, 1882 - The soul of the child: observations on the mental development of man in the first years of life.
 Der Hypnotismus. Ausgewählte Schriften von J. Braid. Deutsch herausgegeben von W. Preyer. Berlin: Paetel, 1882. - Hypnotism. Selected writings of James Braid. German edition by W. Preyer.
 Elemente der allgemeinen Physiologie: Kurz und leichtfasslich. Grieben, Leipzig, 1883 - Elements of general physiology.
 Der Hypnotismus: Vorlesungen gehalten an der K. Friedrich-Wilhelm’s-Universität zu Berlin, von W. Preyer. Nebst Anmerkungen und einer nachgelassenen Abhandlung von Braid aus dem Jahre 1845. Urban & Schwarzenberg, 1890 - Hypnotism: lectures held at the University of Berlin by W. Preyer; in addition to notes and an unpublished memoir by James Braid in 1845.
 Zur Psychologie des Schreibens: Mit besonderer Rücksicht auf individuelle Verschiedenheiten der Handschriften. Hamburg: Voss, 1895

References 

Bibliography
 VL People Biographical Information, William Thierry Preyer
 History of Psychology at Jena
 List of publications copied from an equivalent article at the German Wikipedia.

External links
 
 
 

German physiologists
1841 births
1897 deaths
German psychologists
University of Bonn alumni
British emigrants to Germany
Academic staff of the University of Jena
People involved with the periodic table